François-Olivier Roberge (born September 15, 1985 in Saint-Nicolas, Quebec) is a Canadian speed-skater who represented Canada at the 2006 and 2010 Winter Olympics. He is now studying in Public Communications at University Laval in Quebec.

References

External links 
 

1985 births
Living people
Canadian male speed skaters
Speed skaters at the 2006 Winter Olympics
Speed skaters at the 2010 Winter Olympics
Olympic speed skaters of Canada
Sportspeople from Quebec
Université Laval alumni
21st-century Canadian people